Elizabeth is a town in, and the county seat of, Wirt County, West Virginia, United States, situated along the Little Kanawha River.  The population was 724 as of the 2020 census.

History
The site of Elizabeth was first settled by William Beauchamp (1743-1808) in 1796 when it was still part of the original, vast Harrison County, Virginia. It was known as "Beauchamp's Mills" until 1817 when it was renamed for Elizabeth (Woodyard) Beauchamp (1780-1838), the wife of William's son David Beauchamp (1776-1828).  Elizabeth was chartered by the Virginia General Assembly in 1822 and became the county seat when Wirt County was created in 1848.

Geography
Elizabeth is located at  (39.062852, -81.395529).

Climate
The climate in this area is characterized by hot, humid summers and generally cool winters.  According to the Köppen Climate Classification system, Elizabeth has a humid continental climate, abbreviated "Cfa" on climate maps.

Demographics

2010 census
As of the census of 2010, there were 823 people, 377 households, and 228 families living in the town. The racial makeup of the town was 98.4% White, 0.7% Asian, and 0.9% from two or more races. Hispanic or Latino of any race were 0.2% of the population.

There were 377 households, of which 28.4% had children under the age of 18 living with them, 39.3% were married couples living together, 17.2% had a female householder with no husband present, 4.0% had a male householder with no wife present, and 39.5% were non-families. 36.3% of all households were made up of individuals, and 18.5% had someone living alone who was 65 years of age or older. The average household size was 2.18 and the average family size was 2.79.

The median age in the town was 40.7 years. 22.6% of residents were under the age of 18; 8.1% were between the ages of 18 and 24; 25% were from 25 to 44; 27.1% were from 45 to 64; and 17.1% were 65 years of age or older. The gender makeup of the town was 47.0% male and 53.0% female.

2000 census
As of the census of 2000, there were 994 people, 408 households, and 261 families living in the town. The population density was 2,091.3 inhabitants per square mile (799.6 /km2). There were 466 housing units at an average density of 980.4 per square mile (374.8 /km2). The racial makeup of the town was 99.20% White, 0.10% African American, 0.20% Native American, 0.30% from other races, and 0.20% from two or more races.

There were 408 households, out of which 37.5% had children under the age of 18 living with them, 43.9% were married couples living together, 15.9% had a female householder with no husband present, and 36.0% were non-families. 33.3% of all households were made up of individuals, and 19.9% had someone living alone who was 65 years of age or older. The average household size was 2.38 and the average family size was 2.98.

In the town, the population was spread out, with 28.3% under the age of 18, 8.2% from 18 to 24, 29.1% from 25 to 44, 19.7% from 45 to 64, and 14.7% who were 65 years of age or older. The median age was 34 years. For every 100 females there were 84.8 males. For every 100 females age 18 and over, there were 76.5 males.

The median income for a household in the town was $25,114, and the median income for a family was $30,104. Males had a median income of $24,306 versus $17,813 for females. The per capita income for the town was $12,704. About 20.2% of families and 23.8% of the population were below the poverty line, including 23.0% of those under age 18 and 18.5% of those age 65 or over.

References

County seats in West Virginia
Little Kanawha River
Populated places established in 1796
Towns in Wirt County, West Virginia
1796 establishments in Virginia
Towns in West Virginia